John Holt (27 May 1922 – 4 February 1966) was a British swimmer. He competed in the men's 4 × 200 metre freestyle relay at the 1948 Summer Olympics.

References

External links
 

1922 births
1966 deaths
British male swimmers
Olympic swimmers of Great Britain
Swimmers at the 1948 Summer Olympics
Place of birth missing
British male freestyle swimmers